Senator Swart may refer to:

Peter Swart (1752–1829), New York State Senate
William D. Swart (1856–1936), New Hampshire State Senate